The 35th National Assembly of Quebec was the provincial legislature in Quebec, Canada that was elected in the 1994 Quebec general election and sat from November 29, 1994, to March 13, 1996, and from March 25, 1996, to October 21, 1998. The Parti Québécois led by Jacques Parizeau and Lucien Bouchard were in power during this mandate. Jacques Parizeau resigned after the 1995 Quebec sovereignty referendum which resulted in a narrow victory for the "no" side, and Bouchard succeeded him as PQ leader and Premier in 1996.

Seats per political party

 After the 1994 elections

Member list

This was the list of members of the National Assembly of Quebec that were elected in the 1994 election:

Other elected MNAs

Other MNAs were elected in by-elections during this mandate

 Lucien Bouchard, Parti Québécois, Jonquière, February 19, 1996 
 Monique Simard, Parti Québécois, La Prairie, February 19, 1996 
 Jean-Claude St-André, Parti Québécois, L'Assomption, June 10, 1996 
 Pierre-Étienne Laporte, Quebec Liberal Party, June 10, 1996 
 Nicole Léger, Parti Québécois, Pointe-aux-Trembles, December 9, 1996 
 Diane Leblanc, Quebec Liberal Party, Beauce-Sud, April 28, 1997 
 Lucie Papineau, Parti Québécois, Prévost, April 28, 1997 
 Denis Chalifoux, Quebec Liberal Party, Bertrand, October 6, 1997 
 Michèle Lamquin-Éthier, Quebec Liberal Party, Bourassa, October 6, 1997 
 Normand Duguay, Parti Québécois, Duplessis, October 6, 1997 
 Claude Béchard, Quebec Liberal Party, Kamouraska-Témiscouata, October 6, 1997 
 David Whissell, Quebec Liberal Party, Argenteuil, June 1, 1998

Cabinet Ministers

Parizeau Cabinet (1994-1996)

 Prime Minister and Executive Council President: Jacques Parizeau
 Deputy Premier: Bernard Landry
 Agriculture, Fisheries and Food: Marcel Landry
 Income Security: Jeanne Blackburn
 Concerted Action and Employment: Louise Harel
 President of the Treasury Board, Administration and Public Office: Pauline Marois (1994-1995), Jacques Léonard (1995-1996)
 Culture and Communications: Marie Malavoy (1994), Rita Dionne-Marsolais (1994-1995), Jacques Parizeau (1995), Louise Beaudoin (1995-1996)
 International Affairs, Cultural Communities and Immigration: Bernard Landry (1994-1995)
 Cultural Communities and Immigration: Louise Harel (1995-1996)
 International Affairs: Bernard Landry (1995-1996)
 Health and Social Services: Jean Rochon
 Education: Jean Garon
 Transportation: Jacques Léonard (1994-1995), Jean Campeau (1995-1996)
 Canadian Intergovernmental Affairs: Louise Beaudoin
 Municipal Affairs & Region Development: Guy Chevrette
 Tourism: Rita Dionne-Marsolais
 Environment and Wildlife: Jacques Brassard
 Natural Resources: François Gendron
 Justice: Paul Bégin
 Public Safety: Serge Ménard
 Finances and Revenue: Jean Campeau (1994-1995), Pauline Marois (1995-1996)
 Industry, Commerce, Science and Technology: Daniel Paillé
 Restructuration: Richard Le Hir (1994-1995)

Bouchard Cabinet (1996-1998)

 Prime Minister and Executive Council President: Lucien Bouchard
 Deputy Premier and Vice-President of the Executive Council: Bernard Landry
 Agriculture, Fisheries and Food: Guy Julien
 Income Security: Louise Harel (1996)
 Employment and Solidarity: Louise Harel (1996-1998)
 Labor: Mathias Rioux
 President of the Treasury Board, Administration and Public Office: Jacques Léonard
 Culture and Communications:  Louise Beaudoin
 International Relations: Sylvain Simard
 Indian Affairs: Guy Cheverette
 Health and Social Services: Jean Rochon
 Education: Pauline Marois
 Family and Children: Pauline Marois (1997-1998), Nicole Léger (1998)
 Transportation: Jacques Brassard
 Canadian Intergovernmental Affairs: Jacques Brassard (1996-1998), Joseph Facal (1998)
 Municipal Affairs: Rémy Trudel
 Relations with the Citizens: André Boisclair (1996)
 Relations with the Citizens and Immigration: André Boisclair (1996-1998)
 Metropole: Serge Ménard (1996-1997), Robert Perreault (1997-1998)
 Tourism: David Cliche (1997-1998)
 Environment and Wildlife: David Cliche (1996-1997), Paul Bégin (1997-1998)
 Natural Resources: Guy Chevrette
 Mines, Lands and Forest: Denise Carrier-Perreault (1996-1998)
 Mines and Lands: Denis Carrier-Perreault (1998)
 Regional Development and Forests: Jean-Pierre Jolivet (1998)
 Regions: Guy Chevrette (1998), Jean-Pierre Jolivet (1998)
 Electoral and Parliamentary reform: Pierre Bélanger (1996-1997), Jean-Pierre Jolivet (1997-1998)
 Justice: Paul Begin (1996-1997), Serge Ménard (1997-1998)
 Public Safety: Robert Perreault (1996-1997), Pierre Bélanger (1997-1998)
 Finances and Revenue: Bernard Landry
 Finances (Delegate): Roger Bertrand (1996-1997), Rita Dionne-Marsolais (1997-1998)
 Economy and Finances (State Minister): Bernard Landry
 Industry, Commerce, Science and Technology: Bernard Landry (1996-1998), François Legault (1998)
 Industry and Commerce (Delegate): Rita Dionne-Marsolais (1996-1997), Roger Bertrand (1997-1998)

References
 1994 election results
 List of Historical Cabinet Ministers

Notes

35